Red Horse may refer to:
Red Horse (collaboration), an album and folk group formed by Eliza Gilkyson, John Gorka, and Lucy Kaplansky
The Red Horse, a novel by Eugenio Corti
Red Horse Beer, a beer brewed in the Philippines
Rapid Engineer Deployable Heavy Operational Repair Squadron Engineers, US Air Force engineers
one of the Four Horsemen of the Apocalypse
Vale of the Red Horse, a rural area in South Warwickshire, England
Shorthead Redhorse, a freshwater fish
Red Horse (Lakota chief) (1822-1907), participant in the Battle of the Little Bighorn